This is a list of Buddhist temples, monasteries, stupas, and pagodas in the United Kingdom for which there are Wikipedia articles, sorted by location.

England

Buckinghamshire
 Nipponzan-Myōhōji temple and Peace Pagoda at Willen, Milton Keynes (Japanese)

Hertfordshire
 Amaravati Buddhist Monastery (Thai)

London
 Kaygu Samye Dzong London, Bermondsey (Tibetan)
 London Buddhist Centre (Triratne)
 London Buddhist Vihara (Sri Lankan)
 London Fo Guang Shan Temple, Marylebone (Chinese)
 Mahamevnawa Buddhist Monastery, Watford and Billericay (Sri Lankan)
 Wat Buddhapadipa, Wimbledon (Thai)

Manchester
 Wat Charoenbhavana (Thai)

Northumberland
 Aruna Ratanagiri, Thai Buddhist monastery (Harnham Buddhist Monastery)
 Norwich Zen Buddhist Priory (Japanese)
 Throssel Hole Buddhist Abbey (Japanese)

West Midlands
 Dhamma Talaka Peace Pagoda (Burmese)

West Sussex
 Chithurst Buddhist Monastery (Cittaviveka) (Thai)

Scotland
 Kagyu Samyé Ling Monastery and Tibetan Centre, Dumfries and Galloway (Tibetan)

See also
 Buddhism in the United Kingdom
 Buddhism in England
 Buddhism in Scotland
 Buddhism in Wales
 Buddhist Society
 List of Buddhist temples
 Pali Text Society

Notes

External links

 BuddhaNet's Comprehensive Directory of Buddhist Temples sorted by country
 Buddhactivity Dharma Centres database

 
 
United Kingdom
Buddhist temples